Tallapaka Tirumalamma or Timmakka (15th century) was a Telugu poet who wrote Subhadra Kalyanam in Telugu. She was wife of singer-poet Annamacharya and was popularly known as Timmakka.

Biography
Timmakka was born into a Brahmin's family. She is considered as the first Telugu woman poet.

Timmakka's main work, Subhadra Kalyanam with 1170 poems, is about the marriage of Arjuna and Subhadra, characters in Hindu epic Mahabharata. She presented the Telugu nativity and culture in the story taken from Sanskrit epic.

See also

 Molla, another ancient woman poet in Telugu

References

External links
 A compilation of Telugu poets
 A list of almost all Telugu women poets
 Telugu women poets in Last 1000 years
 Tirmula pages on Tallapaka family
  AnnamayyaKeerthanalu ( Lyrics for Sri Annamacharya Sankeerthanalu in Telugu and English)

Telugu poets
15th-century Indian poets
Year of birth unknown
Year of death unknown
People from Kadapa district
People from Rayalaseema
Indian women poets
Poets from Andhra Pradesh
Women of the Vjayanagara Empire
Vijayanagara poets